Menston railway station is a railway station in Menston, in the City of Bradford, West Yorkshire, England.  On the Wharfedale Line between Ilkley and Leeds/Bradford Forster Square, it is served by Class 331 and 333 electric trains run by Northern Trains, who also manage the station.

The route to Otley was closed in 1965, but the Ilkley line (though also listed for closure in the 1963 Beeching Report) avoided a similar fate, being finally reprieved in 1972. Electric services at the station commenced in 1994.

Between 1883 and 1951, High Royds Hospital, which stood to the west of the line, was served by a half mile long private siding from just south of Menston station.

Menston station was redeveloped in 2000 as part of the general improvements to the Wharfedale Line by the West Yorkshire Passenger Transport Executive.  The disused station building was brought back into use and a new ticket office was opened. The station now includes ticket machines where passengers can buys tickets and view services from Menston. Its current opening times are 06:15–18:00 Mon–Sat and 09:15–17:00 Sunday.  A bus stop was added in the station forecourt.

Services

During Monday to Saturday daytimes services run to/from Leeds and Bradford twice per hour, and there are four services every hour to Ilkley.  During weekday evenings and all day Sundays, services are hourly to/from both Leeds and Bradford Forster Square and twice-hourly to Ilkley.

Onward connections 
The bus stop on the station forecourt is regularly served by the Otley Dash bus, operated by The Keighley Bus Company providing links to Otley & Wharfedale Hospital, as well as Connexionsbuses 963 to and from Otley & Garnett Wharfe.

TLC Travel operate the 635 between Pool, Otley, Shipley and Bradford once a day, both outward and return journeys serve the station forecourt.

First Leeds services 33/34 serve the station forecourt on evenings and Sundays but at other times only stop nearby on Cleasby Road

Notes

References

External links

 

Railway stations in Bradford
DfT Category E stations
Former Midland Railway stations
Railway stations in Great Britain opened in 1865
Northern franchise railway stations
railway station